Crooks and Coronets is a 1969 British crime comedy film and/or heist movie written and directed by Jim O'Connolly. It starred Telly Savalas, Edith Evans, Warren Oates, Cesar Romero and Harry H. Corbett. The film was renamed as Sophie's Place for the US market.

Story
Two recently released convicts, Herbie Haseler and Marty Miller, go to work for New York mob boss Nick Marco. Marco sends them to England to set up the robbery of a large English mansion. The mansion is owned by the kindly and elderly eccentric, Lady Sophie Fitzmore, who plans to pass the mansion and its priceless treasures on to her loyal nephew, Freddie Fritzmore. Sophie owns a full grown male lion named 'Bo-Bo' who is somewhat domesticated but nevertheless guards a portion of the estate. Herbie and Marty tour Lady Sophie's mansion and ingratiate themselves with the old lady. She invites them to live in the mansion with her, a windfall that will help them plan the robbery. Herbie and Marty also meet Frank Finley, the London mob contact for Nick Marco. Herbie, Marty and Finley plan the robbery and the escape route, and make general arrangements for Marco's arrival for the heist. Over time, Herbie and Marty grow fond of Lady Sophie, Freddie, and their servants. At the last minute, they decide they cannot go through with the robbery. Their fondness for Sophie prompts them to prevent Nick and Frank from committing the robbery.

Cast

Critical reception
The Radio Times wrote, "strange casting - a sort of Carry On meets The Dirty Dozen - gives the film a certain interest, not to mention eccentricity...but the overall tone is far too frantic and full of those terribly dated, Swinging Sixties fads and fashions."; while Allmovie described the film as a "delightful crime comedy"; and Sky Movies  wrote, "at times, the pace is as sedate as the English aristocracy portrayed: but the magnificently lunatic climax is worth waiting for, as crooks...are finally repulsed by a concerted counter-attack involving crossbows, a lion, and Edith Evans at the controls of a vintage German plane. It has to be said that Dame Edith has no trouble in beating the Americans at the acting game, either."

See also
 Candleshoe (1977)

References

External links
 
 allmovie/synopsis; Crooks and Coronets
 
 

1969 films
1960s crime comedy films
Films directed by Jim O'Connolly
Films scored by John Scott (composer)
British heist films
1969 comedy films
1960s English-language films
1960s British films